Webster is an unincorporated community in central Ramsey County, North Dakota, United States.  It lies along North Dakota Highway 20 north of the city of Devils Lake, the county seat of Ramsey County.  Its elevation is 1,467 feet (447 m).  it had a post office, with the ZIP code 58382.

References

Unincorporated communities in Ramsey County, North Dakota
Unincorporated communities in North Dakota